Joseph Nikpe Bukari   (born October 3, 1969) is a Ghanaian politician and member of the Sixth Parliament of the Fourth Republic of Ghana representing the  Saboba Constituency in the Northern Region of Ghana.

Personal life 
Joseph is a Christian and a member of the Evangelical Presbyterian. He is married with two children.

Early life and education 
Joseph was born on October 3, 1969. He hails from Saboba, a town in the Northern Region of Ghana. In 2006, he gained admission into the University of Education, Winneba and obtained his Bachelor of Education degree in Technology.

Politics 
Joseph was first elected into parliament on the ticket of the National Democratic Congress during the December 2008 Ghanaian general election as a Member of  Parliament for the Saboba constituency in the Northern Region of Ghana. During the election, he polled 10,331 votes out of the 20,839 valid votes cast representing 49.58%.  He contested again in 2012 Ghanaian general election and polled 13,409 votes out of the 26,058 valid votes cast representing 51.09%. He was defeated in the 2016 Ghanaian general election by Charles Binipom Bintin who represented the New Patriotic Party.

Employment 
Bukari is an educationist. Prior to becoming a Member of Parliament, he worked as the District Training Officer with the Ghana Education Service in Saboba. He joined the Employment, Social Warfare and State House Committee. He was a member of Parliament from 2009 to 2013.

References 

1969 births
Living people
National Democratic Congress (Ghana) politicians
People from Northern Region (Ghana)